James Bowden (born June 4, 1973) is a former American football wide receiver who played eight seasons in the Arena Football League (AFL) with the New York CityHawks, New England Sea Wolves, Tampa Bay Storm, New Jersey Gladiators, Buffalo Destroyers and Orlando Predators. He played college football at North Carolina A&T State University. He was also a member of the Baltimore Ravens of the National Football League (NFL).

Professional career
Bowden signed with the NFL's Baltimore Ravens on July 19, 1996. He was released by the Ravens on August 19, 1996. He played for the New York CityHawks of the AFL from 1997 to 1998. Bowden played for the New England Sea Wolves of the AFL in 1999. He played for the AFL's Tampa Bay Storm from 2000 to 2001, earning Second-team All-Arena in 2001. He was traded to the New Jersey Gladiators on November 12, 2001. Bowden played for the team during the 2002 season. He signed with the Buffalo Destroyers of the AFL on March 6, 2003. He played for the AFL's Orlando Predators in 2004.

References

External links
Just Sports Stats

Living people
1973 births
American football wide receivers
American football linebackers
African-American players of American football
North Carolina A&T Aggies football players
Baltimore Ravens players
New York CityHawks players
New England Sea Wolves players
Tampa Bay Storm players
New Jersey Gladiators players
Buffalo Destroyers players
Orlando Predators players
Players of American football from North Carolina
People from Gastonia, North Carolina
21st-century African-American sportspeople
20th-century African-American sportspeople